Balanophyllia is a genus of solitary corals in the order of stony corals.

Subgenera
The genus includes two subgenera with species as follows: 
Balanophyllia (Balanophyllia) Wood, 1844
 Balanophyllia bairdiana Milne Edwards & Haime, 1848
 Balanophyllia bayeri Cairns, 1979
 Balanophyllia bonaespei van der Horst, 1938
 Balanophyllia capensis Verrill, 1865
 Balanophyllia cedrosensis Durham, 1947
 Balanophyllia cellulosa Duncan, 1873
 Balanophyllia chnous Squires, 1962
 Balanophyllia corniculans (Alcock, 1902)
 Balanophyllia cornu Moseley, 1881
 Balanophyllia crassiseptum Cairns & Zibrowius, 1997
 Balanophyllia crassitheca Cairns, 1995
 Balanophyllia cumingii Milne Edwards & Haime, 1848
 Balanophyllia cyathoides (Pourtalès, 1871)
 Balanophyllia dentata Tenison Woods, 1879
 Balanophyllia desmophyllioides Vaughan, 1907
 Balanophyllia diademata van der Horst, 1927
 Balanophyllia diffusa Harrison & Poole, 1909
 Balanophyllia dilatata Dennant, 1904
 Balanophyllia dineta Cairns, 1977
 Balanophyllia diomedeae Vaughan, 1907
 Balanophyllia dubia (Semper, 1872)
 Balanophyllia elegans Verrill, 1864
 Balanophyllia europaea (Risso, 1826)
 Balanophyllia floridana Pourtalès, 1868
 Balanophyllia galapagensis Vaughan, 1907
 Balanophyllia gemma (Moseley, 1881)
 Balanophyllia gemmifera Klunzinger, 1879
 Balanophyllia generatrix Cairns & Zibrowius, 1997
 Balanophyllia gigas Moseley, 1881
 Balanophyllia hadros Cairns, 1979
 Balanophyllia helenae Duncan, 1876
 Balanophyllia iwayamaensis Abe, 1938
 Balanophyllia japonica Cairns, 2001
 Balanophyllia javaensis† Cairns, 2001
 Balanophyllia kalakauai Wright, 1882
 Balanophyllia laysanensis Vaughan, 1907
 Balanophyllia malouinensis Squires, 1961
 Balanophyllia merguiensis Duncan, 1889
 Balanophyllia palifera Pourtalès, 1878
 Balanophyllia parallela (Semper, 1872)
 Balanophyllia parvula Moseley, 1881
 Balanophyllia pittieri† Vaughan, 1919
 Balanophyllia profundicella Gardiner, 1899
 Balanophyllia rediviva Moseley, 1881
 Balanophyllia regia Gosse, 1853
 Balanophyllia scabra Alcock, 1893
 Balanophyllia scabrosa (Dana, 1846)
 Balanophyllia serrata Cairns & Zibrowius, 1997
 Balanophyllia spongiosa Cairns, 2004
 Balanophyllia striata Duncan, 1876
 Balanophyllia taprobanae Bourne, 1905
 Balanophyllia tenuis van der Horst, 1922
 Balanophyllia thalassae Zibrowius, 1980
 Balanophyllia ukrainensis† Cairns, 2001
 Balanophyllia vanderhorsti Cairns, 2001
 Balanophyllia wellsi Cairns, 1977
 Balanophyllia yongei Crossland, 1952
Balanophyllia (Eupsammia) Milne Edwards & Haime, 1848
 Balanophyllia caribbeana Cairns, 1977
 Balanophyllia carinata (Semper, 1872)
 Balanophyllia imperialis Kent, 1871
 Balanophyllia pittieri Vaughan, 1919
 Balanophyllia regalis (Alcock, 1893)
 Balanophyllia stimpsonii (Verrill, 1865)

References

Dendrophylliidae
Scleractinia genera